The Beechcraft AT-10 Wichita was an American World War II trainer built for the United States Army Air Forces (USAAF) by Beechcraft. It was used to train pilots for multi-engined aircraft such as bombers.

Development

Beechcraft began designing the Model 25 early in 1940 in response to the requirement of the then-named United States Army Air Corps (USAAC) for a small twin-engined aircraft suitable for use in training student pilots in the handling of multi-engined retractable landing gear aircraft. As there were concerns at the time about a future possible shortage of aluminium, part of the requirement was that the aircraft be built of "non-strategic" materials. Beechcraft met this requirement by designing the aircraft to be built primarily from wood. 

The Model 25 prototype was given to the USAAC for evaluation, but it was destroyed in a crash on May 5, 1941. The following day Beechcraft began work on the Model 26, which was soon ready, making its first flight on July 19 the same year. The type was accepted and deliveries began to the USAAF under the designation AT-10 in February 1942 at a time when US military fortunes were at their nadir. 

The type was named "Wichita" after Wichita, Kansas, the location of the Beechcraft factory. By the end of 1942, 748 had been delivered and were playing a part in training crews for the vast fleets of bomber and transport aircraft that were pouring off factory production lines all over the United States. Beechcraft production terminated in 1943 after it had delivered 1,771 AT-10s. Globe Aircraft built another 600 before production finally ceased the following year.

Operators

 United States Army Air Forces

Surviving aircraft

 41-27322 – AT-10 under restoration by AirCorps Aviation for the Cadet Air Corps Museum.
 42-35143 – AT-10 on static display at the National Museum of the United States Air Force in Dayton, Ohio.

Specifications

See also

References

Notes

Bibliography
 Donald, David (editor.) American Warplanes of World War II. London:Aerospace Publishing, 1995. .
 Phillips, Edward H., Beechcraft - Pursuit of Perfection, A History of Beechcraft Airplanes. Eagan, Minnesota:Flying Books, 1992. .
 Taylor, M. J. H. ed. Jane's American Fighting Aircraft of the 20th Century Mallard Press.

External links

 Beech AT-10 Wichita – JSTOR

AT-10
1940s United States military trainer aircraft
Low-wing aircraft
World War II trainer aircraft of the United States
Aircraft first flown in 1941
Twin piston-engined tractor aircraft